is a Japanese expression and theme in art and design originating from a poem by Tang dynasty poet Bai Juyi. It became popular in the late Edo period. It is a metonym for beautiful sceneries in the nature in Japanese.

Introduction
This threefold theme usually refers to the seasons of the year: snow refers to winter, moon refers to autumn and flowers refers to spring. But one could also think it as representations of three whites: blue-white refers to winter, yellow-white refers to autumn and pink-white refers to spring.

Ukiyo-e artists liked to sell prints in series, sometimes even scrolls were painted to be hanged together. Artists liked to combine it with three women, three well known landscapes (moon always with reflecting water) etc.

"Snow, Moon and flowers" appear also as decoration on boxes, backside of traditional mirrors etc.

 Prints by Shiba Kōkan, signed as Suzuki Harushige (1747–1818)

 Prints by Hokusai Katsushika (1760–1849)

 Prints by Utagawa Kunisada (1786–1865)

 Prints by Utagawa Kuniyoshi (1797–1861)

 Prints by Utagawa Hiroshige (1797–1858)

In popular culture

Literature
 In the Unbreakable Machine-Doll light novel, the Setsugetsuka Trilogy is composed of three female automaton sisters; Irori, the eldest sister, representing the snow, Yaya, the second eldest sister, representing the moon, and Komurasaki, the youngest sister, representing the flower.

Comics
 In the Unbreakable Machine-Doll manga, the Setsugetsuka Trilogy is composed of three female automaton sisters; Irori, the eldest sister, representing the snow, Yaya, the second eldest sister, representing the moon, and Komurasaki, the youngest sister, representing the flower.

Video games
 The Japanese title of Fire Emblem: Three Houses is in reference to the theme, as the player spends a full year teaching at the Officer's Academy.
 The JRPG Final Fantasy XIV'''s samurai class is based around the three seals of Snow, Moon and Flowers. With the three, the player may execute an attack named Midare Setsugekka.
 The Tokyo RPG Factory games I Am Setsuna, Lost Sphear and Oninaki are each themed after a component of this phrase.
 In 2018 there was a Collaboration for the mobile game Uta no☆Prince-sama♪ Shining Live: Uta no☆Prince-sama♪ Eternal Song CD "Setsugekka" song collaboration featuring the 11 idols in units Yuki, Tsuki, & Hana. A music video for the song "Setsugetsuka" was also released.

Radio, animation, and television
 In the Unbreakable Machine-Doll anime, the Setsugetsuka Trilogy is composed of three female automaton sisters; Irori, the eldest sister, representing the snow, Yaya, the second eldest sister, representing the moon, and Komurasaki, the youngest sister, representing the flower.
 In the anime Joran: The Princess of Snow and Blood'' three of the main characters are named Yuki, Hana, and Tsuki (Japanese for "snow", "flower", and "moon" respectively)

Notes

External links 

Edo period
Edo-period works
Japanese aesthetics
Moon in art